The 22nd Guards Tank Division was a tank division of the Soviet Army. The division traced its lineage back to the World War II 7th Guards Airborne Division (First formation), which became the 115th Guards Rifle Division after the end of the war. In 1957, the 115th became the 22nd Guards Tank Division. The division was based in the small military town of Novoye, which was quickly renamed Cherkaske after the Cherkassy honorific title of the division. From May 1957, it was part of the 6th Guards Tank Army, relocated from the Transbaikal. The division's 223rd Tank Regiment was transferred from the 16th Tank Division of the 6th Guards Tank Army, formerly stationed in Mongolia. The division was maintained as a high strength cadre division, not ready for combat. December 1985 data recorded the division as totalling 2,550 men with 322 T-64A, twelve BMP-1, three BTR-60, and 108 122mm M-30. It was disbanded in 1990 to make room for the 93rd Guards Motor Rifle Division, which had been withdrawn from Hungary.

Future Army General Yury Yakubov commanded the division's 317th Guards Tank Regiment between 1979 and 1982, then served as deputy division commander until 1984.

1989 Structure 
All units were at Cherkaske. Military Unit Number in parentheses.

 360th Guards Motor Rifle Regiment (32093)
 223rd Tank Regiment (38121)
 302nd Guards Tank Regiment (55363)
 317th Guards Tank Regiment (41437)
 871st Guards Self-Propelled Artillery Regiment (89529)
 1069th Anti-Aircraft Rocket Regiment (63741)
 Separate Rocket Battalion (61528)
 Separate Reconnaissance Battalion
 277th Separate Guards Engineer-Sapper Battalion
 566th Separate Guards Signal Battalion (62802)
 Separate Chemical Defense Company
 Separate Repair and Recovery Battalion
 Separate Medical Battalion
 Separate Material Support Battalion (87024)
 Military Counterintelligence Department

Notes

References

External links 
http://43rd.ru/pervoproxodcy/polkovnik-ananskix-vladimir-vasilevich.html – confirms existence of division

Tank divisions of the Soviet Union
Military units and formations established in 1957
Military units and formations disestablished in 1990
Military units and formations awarded the Order of the Red Banner